Bad Pirawarth is a town in the district of Gänserndorf in Lower Austria in Austria.

Geography
Bad Pirawarth lies near Vienna in Lower Austria in the valley of the Weidenbach, which flows into the March River. It is 18 km from Gänserndorf. About 17 percent of the municipality is forested.

Subdivisions

 Bad Pirawarth
 Kollnbrunn

People 
 Gerhard Ringel, born at Kollnbrunn

References

Cities and towns in Gänserndorf District
Spa towns in Austria